Habronattus americanus is a species of jumping spiders from the family Salticidae.

Description
The female spider is brown and gray, with a small color range. The male spider is black coloured from top, and the male's pedipalp is red, along with parts of the legs. The red color is used to attract female mates with courtship displays.

Habitat
This species lives in western North America, ranging from British Columbia, Canada, in the north to California, United States, in the south. It ranges from the coast into Alberta and Montana. It may reach further, but current knowledge is based only on reported sightings.

References

Salticidae
Fauna of Canada
Fauna of the United States
Spiders of North America
Spiders described in 1885
Fauna without expected TNC conservation status